The Seri Bakti Bridge is one of the main bridges in Putrajaya, Malaysia. The bridge links the secondary road to Seri Satria, the Deputy Prime Minister's Residence, connecting the Government Precinct in the north to Precinct 16 in the south.

There are dual two lane carriageways,  median, walkway and cycle track.

See also
 Transport in Malaysia

Bridges in Putrajaya